Glyphidocera acuminae is a moth in the family Autostichidae. It was described by Adamski and Brown in 2001. It is found in Venezuela.

Etymology
The species name refers to the pointed apical area of the costa of the valva and is derived from Latin acuminatus (meaning pointed).

References

Moths described in 2001
Taxa named by David Adamski
Glyphidocerinae